The Edward Jeremiah Award is awarded yearly to the top coach in Division III men's ice hockey by the American Hockey Coaches Association.

The finalists for each year's award comprise the conference Coach of the Year winners from each Division III men's ice hockey conference, plus the coaches of the Frozen Four teams.

The award was originally given to the top college division coach but when the NCAA changed to numerical divisions in 1973 the honor became available to any coach at the Division II or Division III level. The Division II ice hockey level has only occurred sporadically and thus the Edward Jeremiah Award is only officially awarded to the much more stable D-III level of competition.

Eddie Jeremiah was the long-time coach for Dartmouth College who, in addition to winning 308 college games, wrote an instructional text considered the hockey bible by many.

Award Winners

Winners by school

Multiple Wins

See also
Spencer Penrose Award

References

NCAA Division III ice hockey
Awards established in 1970
1970 establishments in the United States